The National Association for Female Executives (NAFE), is a division of the Working Mother Media, based in New York City. Established in 1972, NAFE is an organization of businesswomen in the United States. It offers education, training, skills development, and networking to women in the business world. NAFE has over 60,000 members. The average NAFE member supervises approximately five people at work, and has at minimum a four-year college degree.  NAFE also publishes a quarterly magazine for its members.

See also
 Glass cliff
 List of female top executives

Notes

Further reading
 Gunter, Barrie. Why Women Should be Taken More Seriously in the Boardroom (Routledge, 2017).
 Oyster, Carol K. "Perceptions of Power: Female Executives’ Descriptions of Power Usage by 'Best' and 'Worst' Bosses." Psychology of Women Quarterly 16.4 (1992): 527-533.
 Vincent, Annette, and Judy Seymour. "Mentoring among female executives." Women in Management Review 9.7 (1994): 15-20.
 Zenger, J., & Folkman, J. "Are Women Better Leaders Than Men?" Harvard Business Review  15 (2012): 80-85. online

External links

Greater Washington Women's Network, local affiliate of NAFE

Women's occupational organizations
Organizations established in 1972
Business organizations based in the United States
1972 establishments in the United States